The 2013 Moselle Open was a men's tennis tournament held in Metz, France and played on indoor hard courts. It was the 11th edition of the Moselle Open, and part of the ATP World Tour 250 series of the 2013 ATP World Tour. It was held at the Parc des Expositions de Metz Métropole from 16 September until 22 September 2013. Second-seeded Gilles Simon won the singles title.

Singles main-draw entrants

Seeds

 1 Rankings are as of September 9, 2013.

Other entrants 
The following players received wild cards into the singles main draw:
  Paul-Henri Mathieu 
  Albano Olivetti
  Gilles Simon

The following players received entry from the singles qualifying draw:
  Márton Fucsovics
  Marc Gicquel
  Pierre-Hugues Herbert
  Mischa Zverev

The following player received entry as a lucky loser:
  Michael Berrer

Withdrawals 
Before the tournament
  Marcel Granollers
  Andreas Haider-Maurer (illness)
  Vasek Pospisil

Retirements
  Philipp Kohlschreiber (right knee injury)
  Paul-Henri Mathieu (right leg injury)

Doubles main-draw entrants

Seeds 

 Rankings are as of September 9, 2013

Other entrants 
The following pairs received wildcards into the doubles main draw:
  Jérémy Chardy /  Marc Gicquel 
  Pierre-Hugues Herbert /  Albano Olivetti

Finals

Singles 

 Gilles Simon defeated  Jo-Wilfried Tsonga, 6–4, 6–3

Doubles 

 Johan Brunström /  Raven Klaasen defeated  Nicolas Mahut /  Jo-Wilfried Tsonga, 6–4, 7–6(7–5)

References

External links
 Official website